Joe Keenan (born July 14, 1958) is an American screenwriter, television producer and novelist. Known for his television work on series like Frasier and Desperate Housewives, Keenan has been referred to as the "gay P.G. Wodehouse" for his three successful fiction novels.

Early life
Keenan was born in Cambridge, Massachusetts into an Irish American Catholic family. He has a twin brother, John, and two other siblings, Ronald and Geraldine. He grew up in the blue collar neighborhood of Cambridgeport. Keenan attended Boston College High School and Columbia College.

Early career
In 1991 Cheers creators James Burrows and Glen and Les Charles, having read Keenan's novel Blue Heaven, invited Keenan to create a new sitcom for their production company. The resulting pilot, Gloria Vane, starring JoBeth Williams, was not picked up by a network, but it led to a writing post on Frasier. In 1992, his first play, The Times, a musical that charts the course of a seventeen-year marriage between Liz, an actress, and Ted, a writer, won the Richard Rodgers Award for Musical Theater, awarded by the American Academy of Arts and Letters. In 1993, the lyrics for The Times won the Edward Kleban Award.

Frasier
He joined the staff of the sitcom Frasier as an executive story editor in 1994 for the series' second year. His first produced script for the series, "The Matchmaker", received an Emmy Award nomination, a GLAAD Media Award, and the 1995 Writers Guild Award for Episodic Comedy. He won a writing Emmy Award in 1996 for being one of eight writers of the classic Season 3 episode, "Moon Dance", and also received Emmy Award nominations for "The Ski Lodge" episode in 1998 and, with Christopher Lloyd, "Something Borrowed, Someone Blue," in 2000, which won the 2001 WGA award for Episodic Comedy.

During his six-season tenure on Frasier he rose through the ranks from executive story editor to co-producer, supervising producer, co-executive producer, and finally, executive producer. He was executive producer when the series ended in 2004. He also co-wrote the series finale, "Goodnight, Seattle." Keenan won five Emmy Awards during his tenure on the show. He was nominated for Outstanding Writing in a Comedy Series five times, and won once.  He won the Outstanding Comedy Series award four times for his work as the show's producer. He also won two Writers Guild of America Awards for his work on the series.

Desperate Housewives and beyond
In 2006, Keenan joined Desperate Housewives as a writer and executive producer for the third season of the television show. Although his work received good critical response, and one of his episodes,"Bang", was named the best of the season by many critics, he left the series after one year.

Keenan also created two short-lived comedy series with fellow Frasier producer and writer Christopher Lloyd: Bram & Alice in 2002 and Out of Practice in 2005. He also co-wrote the 1994 film Sleep with Me as well as the screenplay for the 2007 Annie Award-winning animated feature Flushed Away.

Fiction
Keenan is also a published author, and is commonly referred to as a "gay P.G. Wodehouse". As of 2007, he has written three novels:
 
 Blue Heaven (1988),
 Putting On the Ritz (1991), and
My Lucky Star (2006).
Putting on the Ritz won the Lambda Literary Award for Humor in 1991, and  My Lucky Star won the Lambda Literary Award for Humor in 2006. In October 2007, the novel also won the Thurber Prize for American Humor.

Personal life
Keenan lives in Los Angeles, but does not drive a car. He has been with his husband, Gerry Bernardi, since 1982.

Filmography

References

External links
 
Joe Keenan profile, - GLBTQ Encyclopedia; accessed November 20, 2016.

1958 births
20th-century American novelists
21st-century American novelists
American male novelists
American male screenwriters
American people of Irish descent
Television producers from Massachusetts
American gay writers
Lambda Literary Award winners
American LGBT screenwriters
Living people
Writers from Cambridge, Massachusetts
Writers Guild of America Award winners
American LGBT dramatists and playwrights
American LGBT novelists
LGBT people from Massachusetts
20th-century American dramatists and playwrights
American male dramatists and playwrights
Annie Award winners
20th-century American male writers
Boston College High School alumni
Columbia College (New York) alumni
21st-century American male writers
Novelists from Massachusetts
Screenwriters from Massachusetts